Lithophyllon is a genus of stony corals in the family Fungiidae.

Species
The World Register of Marine Species currently lists the following species:
Lithophyllon concinna (Verrill, 1864)
Lithophyllon ranjithi Ditlev, 2003
Lithophyllon repanda (Dana, 1846)
Lithophyllon scabra (Döderlein, 1901)
Lithophyllon spinifer (Claereboudt & Hoeksema, 1987)
Lithophyllon undulatum Rehberg, 1892

References

Fungiidae
Scleractinia genera